Strategic Arms Reduction Treaty (START) may refer to:
START I, signed on July 31, 1991
START II, signed January 3, 1993
START III, never signed
New START, signed on April 8, 2010